Images is a 1972 psychological horror film written and directed by Robert Altman and starring Susannah York, René Auberjonois and Marcel Bozzuffi. The picture follows an unstable children's author who finds herself engulfed in apparitions and hallucinations while staying at her remote vacation home.

Conceived by Altman in the mid-1960s, Images secured financing in 1971 by Hemdale Film Group Ltd., and shot on location in County Wicklow, Ireland in the fall of that year. The script, which had been sparsely composed by Altman, was collaboratively developed further throughout the shoot with the actors. Images premiered at the 25th Cannes Film Festival, where York won the award for Best Actress, after which it was released theatrically in the United States by Columbia Pictures on December 18, 1972. Its theatrical run in the United States was short-lived, and the film received little promotion from Hemdale in the United Kingdom.

Critical reception of the film was mixed, with some critics praising York's performance and Vilmos Zsigmond's cinematography, while others faulted it for being incoherent, comparing it to films like Repulsion (1965). The film was nominated for a Golden Globe Award for Best English-Language Foreign Film, and John Williams was nominated for an Academy Award for Best Original Score. The film has gained a great deal of stature in the nearly 50 years since it was released, partly because it has been more accessible to viewers and critics than it was on first release, and partly because it stands out in Robert Altman's filmography as the only horror movie he ever directed.

Plot
Wealthy children's author Cathryn receives a series of disturbing phone calls in her home in London one dreary night; the female voice on the other end, sometimes cutting in on other phone conversations, suggests mockingly that her husband Hugh is having an affair. Hugh comes home, finding Cathryn in distress. As Hugh attempts to comfort her, Cathryn witnesses a different man who is behaving as if he were her husband. She screams in horror and backs away, only to see her vision of the figure revert to her husband.

Hugh attributes her outburst to stress and her pregnancy. He decides to take her on a vacation to an isolated cottage in the Irish countryside, where Cathryn can work on her book and take photographs for its illustrations. Immediately upon her arrival, however, Cathryn hears voices saying her name and sees strange apparitions: While preparing lunch one day, she sees her husband Hugh pass through the kitchen, then transform into her dead lover, Rene. Rene continues to appear to her around the house, and even speaks with her.

Cathryn's paranoia and visions become increasingly pervasive, and are exacerbated when a local neighbor and ex-lover, Marcel, brings his adolescent daughter, Susannah, to visit. Cathryn becomes unable to distinguish Hugh from Rene or Marcel, as the men shift before her eyes. One day, Rene taunts Cathryn, asking her to kill him if she wants rid of him, and hands her a shotgun. She shoots him through the abdomen; Susannah, startled by the gunshot, runs into the house, and finds Cathryn standing in the den, having shot Hugh's camera to pieces. Cathryn claims the gun accidentally fired when she was moving it.

Seeking solace, Cathryn goes to a nearby waterfall, where she often sees her doppelgänger staring back at her. After one such occurrence, she returns to the house, where Hugh tells her he has to leave for business. She drives him to the train station and returns to the house, where she finds Marcel waiting inside. He begins to undress to have sex with her, but she stabs him through the chest with a kitchen knife. The next morning, she encounters a local elderly man walking his dog, and invites him to come inside for coffee, in spite of the fact that Marcel's corpse apparently lies in the living room (which suggests that she regards the "murder" as a hallucination, like her shooting of Rene); the old man declines the invitation. Later in the evening, Susannah stops by the house, and remarks that her father was not at home when she awoke that morning. Cathryn is alarmed by this, as it could mean that she really did kill Marcel. She is relieved to hear that Marcel did return drunk after midnight, and invites Susannah in for a cup of tea after reasoning that Marcel cannot be dead on her living room floor. Susannah asks Cathryn if she looked like her when she was young before ominously saying, "I'm going to be exactly like you."

After having tea, Cathryn drives Susannah back home. Marcel comes out of the house and attempts to talk to Cathryn, but she drives away. While on a stretch of road through a desolate field, Cathryn witnesses her doppelgänger again, attempting to wave her down. Back at the house, she finds both Rene and Marcel's corpses have reappeared in the living room. Cathryn leaves again, and encounters her doppelgänger at a bend in the road; this time she stops. The doppelgänger begs Cathryn to let her into the car, and the two begin to speak in unison. She then hits the doppelgänger with the car, throwing her off a cliff and into a waterfall below. Cathryn then drives back to her home in London. At her home, she goes to take a shower. While in the bathroom, the door opens, and the doppelgänger walks inside. Cathryn screams in terror, "I killed you," to which the doppelgänger responds, "Not me." Hugh's corpse is then shown lying at the bottom of the falls.

Themes and interpretations
The film's loose narrative structure and ambiguities have led to numerous readings of it from film scholars. Joe McElhaney suggests in A Companion to Robert Altman, the majority of film critics and scholars have tended to note that Altman's 3 Women (1977) was inspired directly by Ingmar Bergman's Persona (1966), but, according to McElhaney, Altman himself claimed to have been more influenced by the film when writing and directing Images five years prior. In a retrospective interview, Altman attested to this, saying: "What I see becomes personal, so I am as involved in the fabric of those films [with smaller casts] as I am in the others. The difference between those films with many, many characters and small films like Images and 3 Women is just the size of the canvas. Some are small paintings, whereas others are big, broad murals."

Filmmaker Louis Lombardo has read the character of Cathryn as a stand-in figure for Altman himself, and the film thus an exploration of the multi-dimensional creative process. In 1982's American Skeptic: Robert Altman's Genre-Commentary Films by Norman Kagan, he cites the film as an "anti-genre exploration of what might be called the theme of madness. This genre includes such critically revered films as Psycho, Repulsion, and Persona." Writer Frank Caso identified themes of the film as including obsession, schizophrenia and personality disorder, and linked the film to Altman's earlier film That Cold Day in the Park (1969) and his later 3 Women, declaring them a trilogy.

Production

Development
Director Altman, who had begun to write the project in the 1960s, had said that he wanted to make a film similar to the work of Joseph Losey, whose films he admired. According to Susannah York, the shoot was loose in form as well as collaborative, and the cast would meet with Altman over dinner each night to discuss the scenes of the upcoming day: "It was quite a bare script originally," said York. "Certainly I began to have very strong ideas about Cathryn. Cathryn and I seemed to be becoming one in many respects. But Bob drew from all of us, he wanted from us, actors love that, and we all responded. There was never any doubt that he was a master director, the master writer of the story, though he didn't necessarily put pen to paper during all those sessions."

Casting

Altman initially considered several actresses for the lead role, including Vanessa Redgrave, Faye Dunaway, and Julie Christie. However, after seeing Susannah York's performance in Jane Eyre (1970), Altman sought her for the part. After Altman revised the screenplay, York accepted the role, but nearly backed out after discovering she was pregnant. In order to conceal her pregnancy during the shoot, she was dressed in loose-fitting clothing.

The characters' names in the film are the inverses of the real-life names of the actors playing their counterparts: For example, the protagonist Cathryn (played by Susannah York) shares the name of actress Cathryn Harrison, who likewise plays a character named Susannah.

Filming
Images was shot at Ardmore Studios and at a country home in County Wicklow, Ireland, between October and December 1971. According to a piece published by Variety in December 1969 while the film was in pre-production, Altman had intended to shoot the film in North America, specifically in Vancouver, British Columbia, Canada.

Release
Images premiered at the Cannes Film Festival in May 1972, and was released theatrically in November in the United Kingdom by Hemdale. The film was distributed by Columbia Pictures in the United States, premiering in New York City on December 18, 1972. The film's theatrical runs in both countries were short-lived; Hemdale reportedly pulled its advertising campaign from circulation in the United Kingdom, and its distribution in the United States was minimal. In an interview with Variety, Altman lambasted Hemdale for what he saw as their failure to properly promote the film, and criticized the company's head, John Daley.

Critical response
The film received mixed reviews from critics; Roger Ebert gave Images three stars out of four, recommending it to fans of Altman's filmography but also writing that it "inspires admiration rather than involvement. It's a technical success but not quite an emotional one." Gene Siskel also gave the film three stars out of four, praising the "extraordinary photography" and John Williams' "nicely disturbing score," although he found Altman's technique of mixing fantasy and reality "repetitious when extended for nearly two hours." Howard Thompson of The New York Times gave the film a negative review, writing: "As for why Robert Altman, the brilliant director of the comedy, M*A*S*H, elected to write and direct this mish-mash, that's his own business. It just doesn't work." Charles Champlin of the Los Angeles Times wrote, "'Images' is an entertainment, with no solemn claims to be seen as a metaphor for our troubled but laugh-provoking times, and it entertains in a fine, shuddery fashion. Pauline Kael of The New Yorker was negative, writing: "To be effective, the movie needs to draw us in to identify with Susannah York's hallucinations, but the cold shine of the surfaces doesn't do it ... This is a psychological thriller with no psychological content, so there's no suspense and the climax has no power."

Michael Scheinfeld in TV Guide gave the film a positive assessment, writing: "Spectacularly filmed on location in Ireland, the country landscapes become an intricate part of the psychological puzzle, as Altman juxtaposes images such as the "real" Cathryn standing on top of an enormous hill and looking down at "herself;" blood dripping onto a carpet that dissolves into the rippling waves in a river; and mysterious shots of horses, clouds, and waterfalls that echo the voice-over narration of Cathryn's children's story "In Search of Unicorns" (which was actually written by Susannah York). York gives a sensational performance..." Variety also published a favorable review of the film, praising York's performance: "[She has] the intensity and innocence marked by strain as well as sensual underpinnings, and brings off the final denouement with restraint and potency."

John Simon wrote that the film "shows Robert Altman at his most trivial".

Accolades

Home media
In 2003, Metro-Goldwyn-Mayer issued Images on DVD in North America, featuring a documentary short and partial audio commentary with Altman. In 2018, Arrow Films issued a restored version of the film on Blu-ray in the United States and United Kingdom under their Arrow Academy label.

See also
Mental disorders in film
Surrealism

Notes

References

Sources

External links

1972 films
1972 horror films
1970s psychological thriller films
American horror films
American psychological films
American psychological horror films
British horror films
British psychological films
British psychological horror films
1970s English-language films
1970s feminist films
Films about writers
Films about schizophrenia
Films directed by Robert Altman
Films shot in the Republic of Ireland
Films shot in County Wicklow
Films scored by John Williams
Films set in country houses
Home invasions in film
Columbia Pictures films
Films set in London
1970s British films
1970s American films